Gregory Lyle Gisbert (born February 2, 1966 in Mobile, Alabama) is an American jazz trumpeter and flugelhornist.

Early years and school 
Gisbert played drums with his father as a child. He moved with his family to Denver in 1971.  Whilst in the fourth grade at Walt Whitman Elementary, his drumming could be heard throughout the school grounds during recess which he sometimes skipped to practice in the hall. Later he picked up the Flugelhorn. During high school in Colorado Gisbert auditioned for and played with the 1983/84 McDonald's All-American High School Jazz Band; he toured and recorded with the group. After high school he attended the Berklee College of Music in 1984-85, where he recorded with Cyrus Chestnut as part of Phil Wilson's Rainbow Band.

Professional work 
During his brief time in school at Berklee, Gisbert was offered to go on the road with Buddy Rich as a connection made through Wilson.   Gisbert's credits have then included: Buddy Rich (1985–86), Woody Herman's band under Frank Tiberi's direction (1987–89), John Fedchock and Maria Schneider, Gary Burton (1989), Lew Anderson (1989) and Toshiko Akiyoshi (1989 and subsequently). In the 1990s he played with Mingus Epitaph (1990–92), Frank Wess, Clark Terry, Mickey Tucker and Buck Clayton (1991), Danny D'Imperio (1991) Norman Simmons (1992), John Hicks (1992), Fedchock and Schneider again, and with the Convergence quintet. From 1994 to 1997 he worked with Joe Roccisano, and recorded with Chuck Bergeron, Loren Schoenberg and Ken Peplowski. He accompanied Carol Sloane and Susannah McCorkle in large ensembles in 1996. He has recorded three albums under his own name for Criss Cross Jazz.

In recent years, Gisbert has become an active and highly respected jazz educator, teaching at festivals and conducting clinics across the United States.  He also had two stints on the Jazz faculty at the University of Miami in the 2000s.

He has also branched out in producing; bringing the up-and-coming conductor and composer, Chie Imiazumi, to the public's attention, acting as producer of her debut album, "Unfailing Kindness".

Additionally, Gisbert is a founding member of Convergence, whose members include Paul Romaine on drums and John Gunther on saxophone. The highly regarded group is based out of Colorado and can be often heard playing in Denver at Dazzle Jazz Club.

Greg also founded the Greg Gisbert Syndicate in early 2016 and appeared in an eight-week Artist in Residency at Nocturne Jazz & Supper Club. Members of this band included Guitarist Steve Kovalcheck, Bassist Patrick McDevitt, Pianist Annie Booth, and Drummer Mark Emmons.

Discography

As leader
Harcology (Criss Cross Jazz, 1992)
Gisbert and Gunther, Big Lunage (Capri Records, 1993)
On Second Thought (Criss Cross, 1996)
Court Jester (Criss Cross, 1999)

As sideman
With the Joe Roccisano Orchestra
Leave Your Mind Behind (Landmark, 1995)
'Annie Booth Sextet - Abundance (Live At Mighty Fine), 2017

References

Gary W. Kennedy, "Greg Gisbert". Grove Jazz'' online.

American jazz trumpeters
American male trumpeters
Living people
1966 births
21st-century trumpeters
Jazz musicians from Alabama
21st-century American male musicians
American male jazz musicians
Mingus Big Band members
Criss Cross Jazz artists